Bambandyanalo is an archaeological site in present-day Zimbabwe, just north of the Limpopo River. It flourished from the 11th to 13th centuries, being a predecessor to the Great Zimbabwe culture. The ruins have survived because much of the complex was built in stone. The site contains a large mound, some 180 metres in diameter, and covers an area of about 5 hectares. It is surrounded on three sides by sandstone cliffs (Wood 2005:86). In the 11th century, Bambandyanalo developed its influence over the region and established itself as a hub in the trade connecting the African inland with the Indian Ocean (Hall 1987:83). It was closely associated with Mapungubwe and was a precursor to the much better known Great Zimbabwe near Masvingo, 125 miles to the northeast.

The climate was wetter when Bambandyanalo flourished (the "medieval warm period"), and archaeological evidence (carbonized seeds) shows that sorghum and millets were cultivated (Huffman 1996:57). Sometime around 1270 however, the climate changed for the worse ("the little ice age") and the settlement was abandoned as the crops repeatedly failed. This was the period when Great Zimbabwe began its rise to prominence, as it had a better climate due to its location by the South East escarpment.

References
 

Archaeological sites in Zimbabwe
Archaeological sites of Eastern Africa